Manuchehr Khan Gorji Mo'tamad al-Dawle (died 1847) was a government official in Qajar Iran. He was of Georgian origin; hence, Gorji (i.e., "Georgian") in his surname. He was known as a sympathizer of Báb, the founder of Bábism religious movement.

Biography 
Manuchehr was Christian by birth and from Tbilisi. His original Georgian name was Chongur Enakolopashvili. In his early life, he participated in the campaign of General Pavel Tsitsianov during the Russo-Persian War of 1804-1813, but was captured by the Iranian troops near the Yerevan Fortress in the summer of 1804, converted to Islam, and castrated. Given an employment in the shah's harem, he rose to higher court and government positions by virtue of his military and administrative skills. Manuchehr Khan was heavy-handed in dealing with tribal and urban revolts and used his good contacts with the court to further his influence. 

Inside the court, he formed an alliance with Khosrow Khan Gorji. In 1837, the governor of Kermanshah, Bahram Mirza, who was also the brother of then incumbent king Mohammad Shah Qajar (r. 1834–1848), was recalled to the Iranian capital of Tehran after complaints by the people of his governorate. Manuchehr was subsequently appointed as the new governor of Kermanshah. 

In 1838, he was given the governorship of Isfahan, an office he would keep until his death. In 1839, the entire Isfahan Province was added to the domain of Manuchehr Khan Gorji, which already included Kermanshah, Khuzestan, and Lorestan. As a result, "he became in effect the viceroy of much central and southwestern Iran and delegated authority in Kermanshah to a series of subordinate governors". Around the same time, still in the 1830s, Manuchehr Khan was responsible for the establishment of a central court of justice in Isfahan, which had both secular and religious judges, and in its implementation was "roughly resembling the historical maẓālem court". 

The court however, was disbanded due to the presented opposition of those who found it to be working against their personal interests. When Báb arrived in Isfahan in 1846, Manuchehr gave him protection and, allegedly, offered military services to conquer Iran and spread his teachings into the country and even beyond it. Báb reportedly declined the offer, but accepted the governor's protection. Manuchehr Khan died shortly thereafter and Báb, left without an influential patron, fell in disfavor with the shah. Manuchehr Khan was buried at the Fatima Masumeh Shrine in Qom. He was succeeded as governor of Isfahan by Ḡolām-Ḥosayn Khan Sepahdār.

References

Sources 
 
 
 
 
 
 

18th-century births
1847 deaths
Year of birth unknown
Military personnel from Tbilisi
Qajar governors of Isfahan
Georgian emigrants to Iran
Shia Muslims from Georgia (country)
Former Georgian Orthodox Christians
Converts to Shia Islam from Eastern Orthodoxy
People of the Russo-Persian Wars
Burials in Iran
History of Kermanshah Province
Qajar governors
History of Lorestan Province
History of Khuzestan Province